Emilio Berio (13 October 1905 – 28 October 1993, Genoa) was an Italian entomologist and lawyer.

He described several new genera and species of moths, mostly Noctuidae.

Publications
Berio, E. 1935. Nuove Arctiidae d'Africa del Museo di Genova. - Ann. del Museo Civico di Storia Nat. di Genova 59:26-27
Berio, E. 1935b. Nuove specie di eteroceri Amatidae –Arctiidae –Noctuidae.- Annali Mus. Civ.di Storia Nat. Genova 58:56–65
Berio, E. 1936a. Specie nuove di lepidotteri della Somalia italiana (Arctiidae; Erastriinae). - Boll. Soc. ent. it. 38(1–2):27–28.
Berio, E. 1937a. Nuove specie di eteroceri Noctuidae – Lymantriidae – Limacodidae – Geometridae. - Ann. del Museo Civico di Storia Nat. di Genova 58:174–181.
Berio, E. 1937b. Eteroceri africani apparentemente nuovi. - Ann. del Museo Civico di Storia Nat. di Genova 59:370–393.
Berio, E. 1938b. Spedizione zoologica del Marchese Saverio Patrizi nel Basso Giuba e nell'Oltregiuba Giugnop-Agosto 1934. Lista dei lepidotteri eteroceri con note e diagnosi di eteroceri africani. - Ann. del Museo Civico di Storia Nat. di Genova 58:189–203.
Berio, E. 1939a. Contributi alla conoscenza dei lepidotteri eteroceri dell'Eritrea I. - Mem. Soc. Ent. Ital. 17:47–62, pls. 1–2.
Berio, E. 1939c. Lepidoptera. – In: Missione biologica nel paese dei Borana. Raccolte zoologiche. - — :9–15.
Berio, E. 1940a. Contributo alla conoscenza dei lepidotteri eteroceri dell'Eritrea III. - Bollettino della Soc. ent. italiana 72(2):21–24.
Berio, E. 1940b. Lepidotteri raccolti dal col. Mommeret ad Asmara nel Lug.-Ott.1934 con descrizione di une nuova Asticta (Noctuidae). - Boll. Soc. ent. ital. 72(3):42–44
Berio, E. 1940c. Diagnosi di eteroceri africani. - Mem. Soc. Ent. Ital. 19:125–128.
Berio, E. 1940d. Contributi per una monografia del genere Ozarba Hb. (Lpe. Noctuidae). - Mem. Soc. Ent. Ital. 19:173–189.
Berio, E. 1940e. Contributo alla conoscenza dei lepidotteri eteroceri dell'Eritrea V. - Bollettino della Soc. ent. italiana 72(8):122–126.
Berio, E. 1940f. Contributo alla conoscenza dei lepidotteri eteroceri dell'Eritrea IV. - Mem. Soc. Ent. Ital. 19:190–192
Berio, E. 1940g. Contributo alla conoscenza dei lepidotteri eteroceri dell'Eritrea VI. Eteroceri raccolti dal cap. Richini ad Adi-Abuna - Boll. Soc. ent. ital. 72(10):161–165.
Berio, E. 1941b. Contributo alla studio dei lepidotteri eteroceri dell'Eritrea VII. Euchromiidae, Arctiidae, Agaristidae, Lymantriidae, Lasiocampidae, Noctuidae. - Ann. del Museo Civico di Storia Nat. di Genova 61:176–190.
Berio, E. 1941c. Elenco di lepidotteri eteroceri raccolti da Querci-Romei in Somalia con diagnosi di nuove specie. - Mem. Soc. Ent. Ital. 20:118–124
Berio, E. 1944. Missione biologica Sagan-Omo diretta dal Prof. E. Zavattari. Lepidoptera Agaristidae e Noctuidae. - Mem. della Società Ent. Italiana 23:74–79.
Berio, E. 1950a. Terzo contributo alla conoscenza del gen. Ozarba Wlk. (Lep. Noctuidae). - Ann. del Museo Civico di Storia Nat. di Genova 64:131–157.
Berio, E. 1950b. Diagnosi di nuove specie di nottue (Lepid. Noctuidae = Agrotidae). - Bollettino della Soc. ent. italiana 80(9–10):89–92.
Berio, E. 1954b. Note sulla sistematica dei generi Achaea Hb. e affini (Lep. Noctuidae). - Bollettino della Soc. ent. italiana 84(1–2):22–24.
Berio, E. 1954c. Osservazioni su Polydesma umbricola Bdv. e sul genere Polydesma Bdv. (Lep. Noctuidae). - Doriana 1(50):1–8.
Berio, E. 1954e. Nuove Catocalinae africane al Museo del Congo Belga di Tervuren. - Ann. del Museo Civico di Storia Nat. di Genova 66:336–343
Berio, E. 1954g. Etude de quelques Noctuidae Erastriinae de Madagascar (Lepid. Noctuidae). - Mém. de l'Institut scientifique de Madagascar (E) 5:133–153; pls. 6, 7.
Berio, E. 1955c. Osservazioni sul gen. Hypocala e diagnosi di una nuova specie. - Bollettino della Società entomologica italiana 85:84–88
Berio, E. 1955d. Georyx muscosa Gey. e le specie affini (Lepid. Noct.). - Revue de Zoologie et Botanique Africaines 51(3–4):212–222.
Berio, E. 1955e. Diagnosi preliminari di Noctuidae africane (Lepidoptera). - Bollettino della Soc. ent. italiana 85(7–8):124–125.
Berio, E. 1955f. Sulla distribuzione geografica della Noctua algira L. e sulle specie affini (Lep. Noctuidae). - Boll. Soc. ent. ital. 85(9–10):140–148.
Berio, E. 1956a. Diagnosi preliminari di Noctuidae apparentemente nuove. - Memorie della Società Entomologica Italiana 35:23–34.
Berio, E. 1956b. Contribution à l'étude des Noctuidae de Madagascar. - Mém. de l'Inst. scientifique de Madagascar (E) 6:109–140.
Berio, E. 1956d. Eteroceri raccolti dal Dr. Carlo Prola durante la spedizione alle isole dell'Africa orientale con descrizione di specie nuove (Lepidoptera). - Boll. Soc. ent. ital. 86(5–6):82–87.
Berio, E. 1959a. Descrizione di tre specie nuove di Noctuidae provenienti dell'isola di Aldabra e de Nairobi (Kenya). - Bollettino della Società entomologica italiana 89(1–2):11–12.
Berio, E. 1960a. Descrizione di alcune nuove Noctuidae del Madagascar al Museo di Parigi. - Annali del Mus. civ. di storia naturale Giacomo Doria 71:83:98
Berio, E. 1960b. Studi sulla sistematica dell cosiddette "Catocalinae" e "Othreinae" (Lep. Noctuidae). Annali Mus. civ. di storia nat. Giacomo Doria 71: 276-327
Berio, E. 1962a. Diagnosi e sinonumie di Noctuidae dell'Africa centrale (Hadeninae). - Doriana 3(121):1–6.
Berio, E. 1962b. Diagnosi di alcune Noctuidae delle isole Seicelle e Aldabra. - Annali del Museo Civico di Storia Naturale di Genova 73:172–180.
Berio, E. 1962c. Diagnosi di alcune specie di Noctuidae africane. - Bollettino della Società entomologica italiana 92(7–8):122– 126.
Berio, E. 1962d. Descrizione di nuove Noctuidae africane (Euxoinae). - Annali del Museo Civico di Storia Naturale di Genova 73:196–208.
Berio, E. 1963a. Descrizione di alcune Jaspidiinae Africane del British Museum. - Bollettino della Società entomologica italiana 93(5–6):72–74.
Berio, E. 1964a. Su alcune spezie del gen. Aspidifrontia Hmps. con descrizione di nuove entità (Lepidoptera-Noctuidae-Hadeninae). - Ann. Museo Civ. di Storia Nat. Giacomo Doria 74:222–232.
Berio, E. 1964b. Nuovi taxa di Noctuidae Africane. - Bollettino della Società entomologica italiana 94(5–6):87–90.
Berio, E. 1964d. Nuove specie e nuovo genere di Jaspidiinae del Madagascar, con figure di apparati genitali di Microplexia 'Lepidoptera, Hadeninae). - Boll. Soc. entomologica ital. 94(7–8):120–125.
Berio, E. 1964g. Osservazione sul gen. Delta Saalm. con descrizione di nuove entità africane (Lepidoptera - Noctuidae). - Doriana 3(144):1–5.
Berio, E. 1964i. Appunti su alcune specie ascrite al gen. Episparis Wlk. con descrizione di nuovi taxa Africani (Lepidoptera, Noctuidae). - Doriana 4(151):1–5
Berio, E. 1965a. Le Catocaline Africane a tibie spinose del Museo di Tervuren. - Annali del Museo Civico di Storia Naturale Giacomo Doria 75:181–332.
Berio, E. 1965b. Sistematica di alcune Noctuidae Africane con descrizione di nuove entità (Lepidoptera). - Bollettino della Società entomologica italiana 95(9–10):144–148.
Berio, E. 1965c. Afrenella jansei n. gen. n. sp. di Amphipyrinae dell'Africa Centrale (Lepidoptera, Noctuidae). - Mem. Soc. Entomologica Italiana 1965:94.
Berio, E. 1966a. Reperti di nuove Amphipyrinae dell'Africa Equatoriale con note sinonimiche (Lepidoptera - Noctuidae). - Boll. della Soc. ent. ital. 96(1–2):31–34.
Berio, E. 1966c. Pandesma muricolor n. sp. e Subpandesma n. gen. (Lepidoptera, Noctuidae). - Boll. della Soc. ent. italiana 96(7–8):139–140.
Berio, E. 1966e. Descrizione di nuove Noctuidae Africane e note sinonimiche. - Annali del Museo Civico di Storia Naturale di Genova 76:110–136.
Berio, E. 1969. Nuovo genere e specie di Noctuidae d'Africa. - Bollettino della Società entomologica italiana 99:45–48.
Berio, E. 1970. Diagnosi di nuove specie esotiche di Noctuidae (Lepidoptera). - Bollettino della Società entomologica italiana 102(1–2):21–29.
Berio, E. 1971b. Revisione del gen. Polydesma Boisd. E Trichopolydesma Berio (Lepidoptera, Noctuidae). - Ann. Museo Civico di Storia Nat. Genova 78:264-300; pls. 1–2.
Berio, E. 1972a. Nuove specie e genere di Noctuidae Africane e Asiatiche e note sinonimiche. Parte I. - Mem. della Società Ent. Italiana 51:169–182.
Berio, E. 1973. Nuove specie e genere di Noctuidae Africane e Asiatiche e note sinonimichi. Parte II. - Ann. del Museo Civico di Storia Nat. di Genova 79:126–171.
Berio, E. 1974a. Nuove specie e generi di Noctuidae africane e asiatiche e note sinonimiche. Parte III. - Boll. della Società ent. italiana 106(3–4):53–59.
Berio, E. 1975. Nuove genere e nuove specie di Noctuidae Africane (Lepidoptera). - Ann. del Museo Civico di Storia Nat. di Genova 80(1974):217–225.
Berio, E. 1976. Nuovi generi e specie di Noctuidae dell'Africa equatoriale (Lepidoptera). - Ann. del Museo Civico di Storia Nat. di Genova 81:96–123.
Berio, E. 1977b. Diagnosi di nuovi taxa di Noctuidae del globo (Lepidoptera). - Ann. del Museo Civico di Storia Nat. Giacomo Doria 83:321–339.
Berio, E. 1984. Noctuidae. – In:Rougeot. Missions entomologiques en Ethiopie 1976–1982. - Mém. du Muséum nat. d'Histoire naturelle (A)128:42–48, pl. 3.
Berio, E. 1985. I nottuidi raccolti in Somalia del Prof. Simonetta nel 1978–79 con descrizione di nuovi taxa. - Contributi faunistici ed ecologici, Univ. di Camerino 1:5–39
Berio, E. 1985. Fauna d'Italia 22. Lepidoptera: Noctuidae I. Generalità Hadeninae Cucullinae. Ed. Calderini
Berio, E. 1987. Descrizione di nuove specie di Noctuidae (Lepidoptera) dell Eritrea e del Kenia. - Ann. del Museo Civico di Storia Nat. Giacomo Doria 86:247-250 
Berio, E. 1991. Fauna d'Italia 27. Lepidoptera Noctuidae II. Ed. Calderini
Berio, E. 1993. Un Genre nouveau et trois Noctuelles nouvelles du Kenya et de Tanzanie. Tropical Lepidoptera, 4(1): 7-12

References

Italian lepidopterists
1905 births
1993 deaths
20th-century Italian zoologists